Jon Trott may refer to:

Jonathan Trott, England cricketer
Jon Trott, editor of the magazine Cornerstone